La musique de Furia – Un film de Alexandre Aja is the original  soundtrack of the 1999 film Furia, written and recorded by Brian May. It is May's third solo album, his first soundtrack album, and to date his final full album as a solo artist. It is predominantly instrumental, with the exception of the song "Dream of Thee", which features vocals by May.

Track listing
 "Furia Theme – Opening Titles" – 4:40
 "First Glance (Solo Flute)" – 1:35
 "Landscape" – 1:14
 "Tango: 'Cuesta Abajo'" – 2:59
 "The Meeting (Solo Guitar)" – 1:35
 "First Kiss" – 2:03
 "Storm" – 2:19
 "Phone" – 1:07
 "Pursuit" – 3:45
 "Diner" – 1:18
 "Apparition" – 1:36
 "Arrest" – 1:28
 "Father and Son" – 1:34
 "Aaron" – 0:49
 "Fire" – 0:55
 "Gun (Solo Violin)" – 1:55
 "Reggae: 'Bird in Hand'" – 3:30
 "Killing" – 1:13
 "Escape" – 1:50
 "Go On" – 2:19
 "Dream of Thee" – 4:36
 "Alternative Gun" – 1:33 (bonus track)

Personnel
Brian May – writing, arrangement, production; vocals, guitars and keyboards programming.
Justin Shirley-Smith – co-producing and engineering.
Michael Reed – orchestrations (performed by The London Musicians Orchestra, conducted by Michael Reed)
Phillipa Davies – solo flute
Rolf Wilson – first violin
Dave Lee – solo horn
Emily May – 'apparition' vocal
Dick Lewzey – engineer for orchestral recording
Erik Jordan – assistant engineer
Sylvia Addison – fixer
Richard Ihnatowicz – copyist
Kevin Metcalfe and Gordon Vicary – mastering at The Soundmasters, London
Richard Gray – sleeve design (with Brian May), artwork
Jerome Trebois – front cover illustration
Alexandre Aja – director and producer of the film

"Tango: 'Cuesta Abajo'" written by Carlos Gardel, performed by Manuel Cedron.

"'Bird in Hand'" written by Lee Scratch Perry, performed by The Upsetters.

Liner notes: "Respect to Julio Cortázar, author of the novel Graffiti."

References

External links

Brian May albums
Film soundtracks
2000 soundtrack albums
EMI Records soundtracks